This is the order of battle for the Battle of Belgium, a World War II battle between German and Allied forces in Belgium on 10–28 May 1940.

Allied armed forces

Belgian air service
The Belgian Air Service (Aéronautique Militaire Belge) comprised three main aerial regiments:

 1er Régiment d'Aéronautique (1st Air Regiment - Observation and Army Cooperation aircraft)
1er Groupe (Fairey Fox)
2e Groupe (Fairey Fox)
3e Groupe (Fairey Fox)
4e Groupe (Fairey Fox)
5e Groupe (Renard R.31)
6e Groupe (Renard R.31)
 2e Régiment d'Aéronautique (2nd Air Regiment - Fighter aircraft)
1er Groupe (Gloster Gladiator & Hawker Hurricane)
2e Groupe (Fiat CR.42)
3e Groupe (Fairey Fox)
 3e Régiment d'Aéronautique (3rd Air Regiment - Reconnaissance and Bomber aircraft)
1er Groupe (Fairey Fox)
3e Groupe (Fairey Battle & Fairey Fox)

The Aéronautique Militaire Belge was reinforced by the Royal Air Force:

 RAF Advanced Air Striking Force (Air Vice-Marshal P H L Playfair)
 No. 14 Group RAF (Group Captain P.F. Fullard)

Belgian Army

The strength of the Belgian Army extended to seven Corps, a Cavalry Corps and several ad hoc units and fortresses. In the following overview, the position of each division at the start of hostilities on May 10, 1940 is given in parentheses.
 I Corps - Lieutenant-General Alexis Vander Veken
 4th Infantry Division - Lieutenant-General René de Grave (Albert Canal: sector Diepenbeek-Eigenbilzen)
 7th Infantry Division - Major General Eugène Van Trooyen (Albert Canal: sector Eigenbilzen-Lixhe) 
 II Corps - Lieutenant-General Victor Michem
 6th Infantry Division - Lieutenant-General Emile Janssens (Albert Canal: sector Eindhout-Beringen)
 9th Infantry Division - Lieutenant-General Richard Vander Hofstadt (Albert Canal: sector Herentals-Eindhout)
 III Corps - Lieutenant-General Joseph de Krahe
 2nd Infantry Division - Lieutenant-General Auguste Colpin (Fortified Position Luik: sector Chaudfontaine-Engis)
 3rd Infantry Division - Lieutenant-General Gaston Lozet (Fortified Position Luik: sector Chertal-Chaudfontaine)
 IV Corps - Lieutenant-General André Bogaerts
 12th Infantry Division - Major General Constant De Wulf (Fortified Position Antwerp: sector Sint Job-in't-Goor - Massenhoven) 
 15th Infantry Division - Lieutenant-General Baron Raoul de Hennin de Boussu-Walcourt (Albert Canal: sector Massenhoven - Herentals) 
 18th Infantry Division - Lieutenant-General Henri Six (Advance Position: sector Sint-Lenaerts - Dessel) 
 V Corps - Lieutenant-General Edouard Van Den Bergen
 13th Infantry Division - Major General François Duthoy (Fortified Position Antwerp: sector Kapellen - Turnhout Canal)
 17th Infantry Division - Major General Raoul Daufresne de la Chevalerie (Fortified Position Antwerp: sector Berendrecht - Kapellen)
 VI Corps - Lieutenant-General Fernand Verstraeten
 5th Infantry Division - Lieutenant-General Maurice Spinette (Transversal position: sector Halle - Ninove) 
 10th Infantry Division - Lieutenant-General Jules Pire (KW Line: sector Leuven)
 VII Corps - Lieutenant-General Georges Deffontaine
 8th Infantry Division - Major General André Lesaffre (Fortified Position Namur)
 2nd Division Chasseurs Ardennais - Major General François Ley (Meuse River: sector Engis - Andenne)
 Cavalry Corps  - Lieutenant-General Knight Maximilien de Neve de Roden
 1st Infantry Division - Lieutenant-General Walter Coppens (Albert Canal: sector Hasselt) 
 14th Infantry Division - Lieutenant-General Armand Massart (Albert Canal: sector Beringen - Stokrooie) 
 2nd Cavalry Division - Major General Joseph Beernaert (Demer/Gete Position)
 Group Ninitte - Major General Robert Ninitte (Advance Position: Dessel - Maasmechelen)
 Group K - Lieutenant-General Maurice Keyaerts
 1st Cavalry Division - Lieutenant-General Maurice Keyaerts (Advance Position Ardennes: Neufchateau)
 1st Division Chasseurs Ardennais - Major General Werner Goffinet (Advance Position Ardennes: Sint-Hubert)
 General Army Reserve 
 11th Infantry Division - Major General Ivan Lebert (Camp Beverlo)
 16th Infantry Division - Lieutenant-General Georges Van Egroo (Ghent Bridgehead)

French First Army Group

1st Army

 Cavalry Corps
 2nd Light Mechanized Division
 3rd Light Mechanized Division
 3rd Corps
 1st Moroccan Infantry Division
 2nd North African Infantry Division
 4th Corps
 32nd Infantry Division
 5th Corps
 5th North African Infantry Division
 101st Infantry Division
 Belgian VII Corps
 2nd Chasseurs Ardennais
 8th Infantry Division

2nd Army

 Direct reporting:
 2nd Light Cavalry Division
 5th Light Cavalry Division
 1st Cavalry Brigade
 10th Corps
 3rd North African Infantry Division
 5th Light Cavalry Division
 55th Infantry Division
 71st Infantry Division
 18th Corps
 1st Colonial Infantry Division
 41st Infantry Division

7th Army

 Direct reporting:
 21st Infantry Division
 60th Infantry Division
 68th Infantry Division
 1st Corps
 1st Light Mechanized Division
 25th Motorized Division
 16th Corps
 9th Motorized Division

9th Army

 Direct reporting:
 4th North African Infantry Division
 53rd Infantry Division
 2nd Corps
 4th Light Cavalry Division
 5th Motorized Division
 11th Corps
 1st Light Cavalry Division
 18th Infantry Division
 22nd Infantry Division
 41st Corps
 61st Infantry Division
 102nd Fortress Division
 3rd Spahi Brigade

British Expeditionary Force
General Lord Gort

 Directly reporting:
 5th Infantry Division
 12th (Eastern) Infantry Division
 23rd (Northumbrian) Division
 46th Infantry Division
 I Corps - Lieutenant-General Michael Barker
 1st Infantry Division
 2nd Infantry Division
 48th (South Midland) Division
 II Corps - Lieutenant-General Alan Brooke 
 3rd Infantry Division
 4th Infantry Division
 50th (Northumbrian) Infantry Division
 III Corps - Lieutenant-General Ronald Adam
 42nd (East Lancashire) Infantry Division
 44th (Home Counties) Division

German armed forces

Army Group B
Commanded by Colonel General Fedor von Bock
(Chief of Staff - Lt. Gen. Hans von Salmuth).
 Sixth Army —Colonel General  Walter von Reichenau
 (Chief of Staff - Maj. Gen. Friedrich Paulus).
 IV Corps - Gen.of Infantry Viktor von Schwedler
 15th Infantry Division - Maj. Gen. Ernst-Eberhard Hell (reserve)
 205th Infantry Division - Lt. Gen. Ernst Richter
 XI Corps- Lt. Gen. Joachim von Kortzfleisch
 7th Infantry Division - Maj. Gen. Eccard von Gablenz
 211th Infantry Division - Maj. Gen. Kurt Renner
 253rd Infantry Division - Lt.Gen. Fritz Kuhne
 IX Corps
 XVI Corps
 3rd Panzer Division
 4th Panzer Division
 XXVII Corps
 Eighteenth Army — Georg von Küchler
 Reserves
 208th Infantry Division
 225th Infantry Division
 526th Infantry Division
 SS "Verfügungstruppe" Division
 7th Airborne Division
 22nd Air Landing Infantry Division
 9th Panzer Division
 207th Infantry Division
 X Corps
 SS "Adolf Hitler" Division
 227th Infantry Division
 1st Cavalry Division 
 XXVI Corps
 256th Infantry Division 
 254th Infantry Division
 SS "Der Führer" Division

Luftwaffe
The Luftwaffe order of battle for operations over Belgium:
IV. Fliegerkorps (General der Flieger, Generaloberst Alfred Keller)
Lehrgeschwader 1 (Stab. I., II., III., IV. Düsseldorf)
Kampfgeschwader 30 (Stab. I., II., at Oldenburg III. at Marx)
Kampfgeschwader 27 (III. at Wunstorf)
Jagdfliegerführer 2 (Oberst Kurt-Bertram von Döring)
Jagdgeschwader 26 (Stab., II at Dortmund, III. at Essen-Mühlheim)
Jagdgeschwader 3  (III. at Hopsten) 
Jagdgeschwader 51 (Stab. at Bönninghardt, I. at Krefeld)
Jagdgeschwader 27 (II. Bönninghardt)
Jagdgeschwader 20 (I. at Bönninghardt)
VIII. Fliegerkorps (Generalmajor Wolfram von Richthofen)
Jagdgeschwader 27 (Stab.,I.)
Jagdgeschwader 21
Jagdgeschwader 1 (I.)
Sturzkampfgeschwader 76 (I.)
Sturzkampfgeschwader 2 (Stab., I., III.)
Sturzkampfgeschwader 77 (Stab., I, II.)
Lehrgeschwader 1 (IV(St.))
Lehrgeschwader 2 II.(Shl)
Kampfgeschwader 77 (Stab., I., II., III.)

Citations

References

Mitcham, Samuel. Hitler's Legions: The German Army Order of Battle, World War II. Dorset Press, New York. 1985.  (Formerly )
Hooton, E.R. (2007). Luftwaffe at War; Blitzkrieg in the West. London: Chevron/Ian Allan. .
Gunsburg, Jeffrey A., 'The Battle of the Belgian Plain, 12–14 May 1940: The First Great Tank Battle', The Journal of Military History, Vol. 56, No. 2. (Apr., 1992), pp. 207–244.
Belgian Cavalry Corps Order of Battle, 10 May 1940
Aéronautique Militaire Belge Order of Battle

External links
 De Achttiendaagse Veldtocht, containing a diary of every single unit participating in the battle of Belgium
British Expeditionary Force As Organised on 10 May 1940 at CARL

World War II orders of battle
Battle of Belgium
Battles and operations of World War II involving Belgium
Battles of World War II involving the United Kingdom